Joseph Dale Cravens (born March 9, 1954) is a former American college basketball coach. He was the head coach at  Weber State, and the interim head coach at Utah for most of a season.

Born and raised in Scottsburg, Indiana, Cravens played college basketball at Brunswick Junior College in Georgia and transferred to Texas–Arlington for his final two seasons. He was an assistant coach for a year at his alma mater, then at Southwest Texas State in San Marcos for three years, and returned to Texas–Arlington.

In 1985, he joined the staff of new head coach Andy Russo at Washington in Seattle for four years in the Pac-10, then went to Utah under new head coach Rick Majerus in 1989. In mid-December, Majerus required major heart surgery and Cravens took over as interim head coach of the Utes in the WAC for the remainder of that 

After four years in Salt Lake City, Cravens was hired as head coach at Idaho in Moscow in April 1993, succeeding Larry Eustachy, and led the Vandals on the Palouse for three seasons. Promoted to head coach in March  he compiled a  record in seven seasons. Cravens led the 2003 team to an undefeated  record in the Big Sky Conference (26–6 overall), but the Wildcats fell to fifth-seed Wisconsin in the NCAA tournament's first round

After collegiate coaching
In his second year as coach at St. Joseph, Cravens led his girls to the  1-A state championship. They defeated Milford  in the opening round, Manila  in the quarterfinals, Piute  in the semifinals, and heavily favored and defending 1-A champion Rich  in the finals.

Despite losing several key players after their first title, Cravens led the defending champs to an undefeated season in  including victory in their second state title game over Piute,   He stepped down as coach after the 2015 season, but remained at the school as a counselor.

Head coaching record
NCAA Division I

Cravens became interim head coach at Utah prior to the seventh game of the 1989–90 season.

References

External links
Sports Reference – Joe Cravens
Weber State bio (archived from 2005)
Gem of the Mountains: 1994 University of Idaho yearbook – 1993–94 basketball season
St. Joseph Catholic Schools – staff

1954 births
Living people
College basketball announcers in the United States
American men's basketball coaches
Basketball coaches from Indiana
Basketball players from Indiana
College men's basketball head coaches in the United States
High school basketball coaches in Utah
Idaho Vandals men's basketball coaches
UT Arlington Mavericks men's basketball players
Texas State Bobcats men's basketball coaches
UC Irvine Anteaters men's basketball coaches
Utah Utes men's basketball coaches
Washington Huskies men's basketball coaches
Weber State Wildcats men's basketball coaches
American men's basketball players
Guards (basketball)